Thomaz may refer to:

Américo Thomaz (1894–1987), Portuguese admiral and politician
Thomaz (footballer) (born 1986), Brazilian footballer
Thomaz Bellucci (born 1987), Brazilian tennis player
Thomaz Koch (born 1945), Brazilian tennis player
Thomaz Ransmyr (born 1973), Swedish artist
Wiz Khalifa (born 1987 as Cameron Jibril Thomaz), American rapper

See also
Tomás (disambiguation)